The Vyya is a river in Pinezhsky and Verkhnetoyemsky Districts of Arkhangelsk Oblast in Russia. It is a left tributary of the Pinega. The area of its basin . Its main tributaries are the Churova (right), Pyshega (left), and Tineva (left).

The Vyya flows over the hilly landscape of the plain between the valleys of the Northern Dvina and the Pinega, in the conifer forests.

The source of the Vyya is located in the southern part of Pinezhsky District. The Vyya initially flows to the south and enters Verkhnetoyemsky District. The upper Vyya is not populated. The first village on Vyya is Vasilevo. Downstream of Vasilevo, the Vyya accepts the right tributary the Churova and turns north-east, then east. In the village of Tineva it accepts Tineva River, a major left tributary. Downstream of Tineva, a number of villages are located in the valley of the Vyya.

References

External links 

Rivers of Arkhangelsk Oblast